Sarah Faith Griffiths (born 21 January 2001), known professionally as Griff, is an English singer and songwriter. In 2019, she released her debut single, "Mirror Talk", through Warner Records. This was followed by her debut extended play of the same name, released later that year. Griff was named the Rising Star at the 2021 Brit Awards, becoming one of the youngest winners in the category at 20. Later that year, she released her debut mixtape, One Foot in Front of the Other, to commercial success and critical acclaim.

Early life and education 
Griff was born on 21 January 2001 as Sarah Faith Griffiths, and was raised in Kings Langley, Hertfordshire. Her father Mark is the son of Jamaican immigrants who were part of the "Windrush generation", and her mother Kim is a first-generation Vietnamese migrant whose family moved to England amid the Vietnam War. Griff has stated that she feels "more in touch with my Chinese side". Griff's parents foster children and her experiences with the children were reflected in her song "Good Stuff".

Griff stated that her earliest memory of loving music was being gifted an iPod Shuffle with the Taylor Swift album Fearless (2008) downloaded to it, when she was around the age of eight. She then taught herself to record and produce music on her older brother's laptop, and used tutorials on YouTube to inform her on techniques. While attending St Clement Danes School, Griff kept her musical life private, due to not knowing if her musical career would be successful, stating: "no one likes that person at school who talks about how they want to sing". After finishing her A Levels, she told teachers that she was taking a gap year, rather than informing them on her music ventures. On using the stage name Griff, she stated: "Sarah Griffiths isn't that glamorous, I sound like I have a mortgage and 4 kids, it's very corporate".

Griff's family are evangelical Christians and attended a central London branch of Hillsong Church. Of her own faith, Griff has said: "I guess if you grow up with Christian parents, you get to a point where you ask: “Okay, do I actually believe or am I just going through the motions?” And from a young age I felt like it was something I actually do believe and so it’s always been something that I’ve owned."

Career
On 4 July 2019, it was announced that Griff had been signed to Warner Records. On the same day, she released her debut single "Mirror Talk", accompanied by a music video. Annie Mac featured the song on BBC Radio 1 under the New Name playlist. 
She stated that the writing process for the song took an hour. Griff described the release as a career highlight, since it was released immediately after she had finished her A Level exams. Billboard described the song as an "electrifying debut", and praised her "powerful voice and vulnerable lyrics". The next month, Griff released her follow-up single, "Didn't Break It Enough", accompanied by a music video in which the clothing worn was made by Griff herself. She released the single "Paradise" in October 2019, which was followed by the release of her debut extended play, The Mirror Talk, on 15 November 2019. In December 2019, Griff released a cover of the Bangles' 1989 song "Eternal Flame".

On 7 February 2020, Griff released the single "Good Stuff". Despite people thinking the song is about a romantic breakup, she clarified that the subject of the song is about missing children that her family fostered, since they felt like siblings. In March 2020, a song titled "I Love You's", that Griff co-wrote, was released by American singer Hailee Steinfeld. This was followed by "Forgive Myself", a song released by Griff on 29 May 2020, described by NME as an "anthem". In July 2020, Griff was nominated by The Ivors Academy for an Ivor Novello Rising Star Award, and later that month, she released the song "Say It Again". In October 2020, she was part of two collaborative songs; "1,000,000 X Better" with English band Honne, and "Inside Out", a song with German DJ Zedd. In January 2021, she released "Black Hole", which NME described as a "dark pop anthem". On 19 March 2021, Griff won the Brit Award for Rising Star and performed "Black Hole" at the 2021 ceremony. Later that day, she announced details of her debut mixtape, One Foot in Front of the Other, which was released on 18 June 2021. Two months later, Griff followed up the mixtape with single "One Night". In October 2021, she embarked on a tour across the United Kingdom in support of her mixtape. The European tour dates originally announced for 2021 have been rescheduled to March 2022 due to the ongoing COVID-19 pandemic while additional shows have been added in the US and Canada, set to take place in January and February 2022. In November 2021, Dua Lipa announced Griff, Tove Lo and Angèle as the three supporting acts for the European dates of the Future Nostalgia Tour scheduled between April and June 2022.

Discography

Mixtapes

Extended plays

Singles

Music videos

Songwriting credits

Notes

Awards and nominations

References 

2001 births
21st-century English women singers
21st-century English singers
Brit Award winners
English women pop singers
English people of Chinese descent
English people of Jamaican descent
Living people
Musicians from Hertfordshire
Warner Records artists
English Christians